James Oliver Buswell IV (December 4, 1946 – September 28, 2021) was an American violinist, chamber musician, conductor and educator.

Biography
Buswell learned violin at age five. His solo debut took place with the New York Philharmonic at the age of seven. He later studied with Mary Canberg, Paul Stassevich, and Ivan Galamian at the Juilliard School and was a graduate of Harvard University.

He was also a Grammy nominated recording artist for the Barber Violin Concerto with the Royal Scottish National Orchestra.

Buswell was on the faculties of University of Arizona, Indiana University School of Music (1973–1986) and the New England Conservatory (1987–2014). Most recently, he was on the faculty of the Steinhardt School of Culture, Education, and Human Development at New York University with his wife, cellist Carol Ou.

He has four children: Anna Buswell, William Buswell, Joshua Buswell, and Rachel English. He has four grandchildren.

James died September 28, 2021, in Boston.

References

External links
 

1946 births
2021 deaths
American classical violinists
Male classical violinists
21st-century classical violinists
20th-century classical violinists
21st-century American male musicians
20th-century American male musicians
People from Fort Wayne, Indiana
Juilliard School alumni
Harvard University alumni
Indiana University Bloomington faculty
New England Conservatory faculty
Steinhardt School of Culture, Education, and Human Development faculty
Classical musicians from Indiana
20th-century American violinists
21st-century American violinists